The Emperor's New Groove is a 2000 American animated slapstick comedy film produced by Walt Disney Feature Animation and released by Walt Disney Pictures. The 40th animated film produced by the studio, it was directed by Mark Dindal and produced by Randy Fullmer, from a screenplay by David Reynolds, and a story by Dindal and Chris Williams. The voice cast features David Spade, John Goodman, Eartha Kitt, Patrick Warburton, and Wendie Malick. Inspired by ancient Peruvian culture and set in an Incan empire, The Emperor's New Groove follows young and self-centered Emperor Kuzco (voiced by Spade), who is accidentally transformed into a llama by his ex-advisor, Yzma (Kitt), and her dim-witted but affable henchman and sidekick, Kronk (Warburton). For the emperor to change back into a human, he entrusts a village leader, Pacha (Goodman), to escort him back to the palace before Yzma can track them down and finish him off.

Development of The Emperor's New Groove began in 1994, when the film was conceived as a musical epic titled Kingdom of the Sun. Following his directorial debut with The Lion King (1994), Roger Allers recruited English musician Sting to compose several songs for the film. Because of the underwhelming box-office performances of Pocahontas (1995) and The Hunchback of Notre Dame (1996), Dindal was brought in as co-director to make the film more comedic. Because of poor test screenings, creative differences with Dindal, and production falling behind schedule, Allers departed, and the film became a lighthearted comedy in the vein of a Chuck Jones cartoon instead of a dramatic musical. A documentary, The Sweatbox (2002), details the production troubles that The Emperor's New Groove endured during its six years' development.

The Emperor's New Groove premiered at the El Capitan Theatre in Los Angeles on December 10, 2000 and was released to theaters on December 15, 2000. It performed disappointingly at the box office compared to Disney films released in the 1990s, grossing $169.5 million on a $100-million budget. However, the film found larger success when it was released for home media, and became the best-selling DVD of 2001. It received generally favorable reviews from critics, who praised it for its writing, animation, wit, self-aware humor and voice cast (Eartha Kitt and Patrick Warburton often being singled out for praise). It was nominated for an Academy Award for Best Original Song for the song "My Funny Friend and Me", performed by Sting; that award went to "Things Have Changed" by Bob Dylan from Wonder Boys. A direct-to-video sequel, Kronk's New Groove, was released in 2005, and an animated spin-off, The Emperor's New School, aired on the Disney Channel from 2006 to 2008.

Plot

Incan emperor Kuzco is arrogant, entitled, and pampered, has no patience for the needs of others, especially peasants, and abuses his position of power. For his 18th birthday, Kuzco plans to demolish a local village to build a lavish summer mansion – "Kuzcotopia" – against the objections of the village's leader, Pacha. After he fires Yzma, a sorceress and his conniving advisor, she plots to usurp the throne by poisoning Kuzko. Instead, she and her dimwitted but kindhearted assistant Kronk accidentally give him the wrong vial that transforms him into a llama. Yzma orders Kronk to knock Kuzco unconscious, then dispose of him, but a stroke of conscience prevents Kronk from doing the latter, and instead leaves him on a cart, which turns out to be Pacha's.

Kuzco is inadvertently taken by Pacha to his village, where he orders Pacha to take him back to the palace. Pacha refuses to help Kuzco unless he changes his mind and builds Kuzcotopia elsewhere. Refusing the deal, Kuzco heads off to the jungle alone and is attacked by a pack of jaguars. Pacha arrives in time to rescue Kuzco, who reluctantly accepts Pacha's terms to escort him home. While initially at odds, the two learn to cooperate and earn one another's good side. Meanwhile, Yzma, now empress, learns that Kronk did not eliminate Kuzco and sets out to find him. The duos arrive at an eatery at the same time, completely unaware of the others' presence. Pacha overhears Yzma's plans and Kronk nearly recognizes Pacha. When Pacha tries to warn Kuzco about Yzma, Kuzco brushes him off, causing Pacha to leave, only to then overhear Yzma's machinations about himself.

Alone, lost, and realizing no one in the empire (especially his guards) miss him because of his selfishness, Kuzco glumly resigns himself to the life of a llama, but comes across Pacha and the two reconcile. Meanwhile, Kronk finally recalls Pacha and his connection to Kuzco. He and Yzma await them at Pacha's home, posing as distant family members. Pacha has his family delay Yzma, giving him and Kuzco a headstart back to the capital. They reach Yzma's secret lab to grab some potions and encounter a furious Yzma about to kill Kuzco. She orders Kronk to finish him off, but he can't bring himself to do so, causing Yzma to dispose of him. While fleeing Yzma and the palace guards, Kuzco attempts all the potions until there are two left; Yzma accidentally lands on one of the two and turns into a small kitten. Despite the transformation, she, Kuzco and Pacha struggle for the final vial, but Yzma is unexpectedly foiled by Kronk, and Kuzco drinks it, finally reverting him to his human form.

Now completely changed, Kuzco makes amends with those he offended and regains his throne, while also opting to build his summer home, a modest shack, on an unoccupied hill next to Pacha's house, complete with a swimming pool that he shares with Pacha's family. Elsewhere, Kronk has become a scout leader and trains new recruits how to speak squirrel, including the reluctant Yzma, who remains in cat form while serving in Kronk's troop.

Voice cast 

 David Spade as Emperor Kuzco, the entitled, pampered, and arrogant 18-year-old emperor of the Inca Empire who has no patience for the needs of others and has a lack of compassion.
 John Goodman as Pacha, a brave, loving, and respected village leader.
 Eartha Kitt as Yzma, Kuzco's elderly and untrustworthy advisor who seeks Kuzco's throne for herself.
 Patrick Warburton as Kronk, Yzma's friendly but slow-witted muscular henchman and sidekick.
 Wendie Malick as Chicha, Pacha's supportive pregnant wife.
 Kellyann Kelso and Eli Russell Linnetz as Chaca and Tipo respectively, Pacha and Chicha's two young, mischievous children.
 Bob Bergen as Bucky the Squirrel, Kronk's companion, who hates Yzma, and has an unpleasant encounter with Kuzco; and as Fly stuck in web.
 Tom Jones as the Theme Song Guy, Kuzco's personal theme song conductor.
 Patti Deutsch as Mata, a waitress at Mudka's Meat Hut.
 John Fiedler as Rudy, a well-meaning old man who is first thrown out a window by Kuzco's guards, then later befriends him.
 Joe Whyte as the Royal Recordkeeper.
 Jack Angel, Danny Mann, Rodger Bumpass, Paul Eiding, and Patrick Pinney as Male Villagers/Additional Voices.
 Sherry Lynn, Jennifer Darling, and Mickie McGowan as Female Villagers/Additional Voices.
 Jess Harnell as the Guard who throws Rudy out the window and Additional Voices.
 Rodger Bumpass as one of the Guards who got turned into a cow.
 Steve Susskind as an Irate Chef, a former chef at Mudka's Meat Hut who quits due to Kuzco and Kronk.
 Miriam Flynn as the Piñata Lady.
 Jim Cummings and Kath Soucie as Birthday Singers.
 Andre Stojka and Robert Clotworthy as Topo and Ipi, two of Pacha's villagers.

Production

Kingdom of the Sun

Following the theatrical release of The Lion King (1994), Roger Allers was called into Thomas Schumacher's office to discuss his next project. Inside his office, Schumacher explained that Disney Feature Animation was interested in exploring ancient cultures for prospective film projects. He held three pictures representative of Inca, Aztec, and Mayan cultures. Allers chose the Inca culture as he became intrigued with the visual possibilities of the Inca creation myth. Allers would base his story on Anthony Hope's adventure novel The Prisoner of Zenda.

Alongside co-writer Matthew Jacobs, Allers formulated the idea for Kingdom of the Sun, in which development on the project began in 1994. Upon pitching the project to then-Disney CEO and chairman Michael Eisner, Allers recalled Eisner saying "it has all of the elements of a classic Disney film," and because of his directorial success on The Lion King that same year, Eisner allowed Allers to have free rein with both the casting and the storyline. In January 1995, Variety reported that Allers was working on "an Inca-themed original story". In 1996, the production crew traveled to Machu Picchu in Peru, to study Inca artifacts and architecture and the landscape this empire was created in.<ref>[[#DVD2|Supplemental Features: The Research Trip]]</ref>Kingdom of the Sun was to have been a tale of a greedy, selfish emperor (voiced by David Spade) who finds a peasant (voiced by Owen Wilson) who looks just like him; the emperor swaps places with the peasant to escape his boring life and have fun, much as in author Mark Twain's archetypal novel The Prince and the Pauper. However, the villainous witch Yzma has plans to summon Supay (the evil god of death), and destroy the sun so that she may become young and beautiful forever (the sun gives her wrinkles, so she surmises that living in a world of darkness would prevent her from aging). Discovering the switch between the prince and the peasant, Yzma turns the real emperor into a llama and threatens to reveal the pauper's identity unless he obeys her. During his time as the emperor and doing Yzma's orders, the pauper falls in love with the emperor's soon to be fiancée Nina who thinks he is the emperor that has changed his ways. Meanwhile, the emperor-llama learns humility in his new form and even comes to love a female llama-herder named Mata (voiced by Laura Prepon). Together, the girl and the llama set out to undo the witch's plans. The book Reel Views 2 says the film would have been a "romantic comedy musical in the 'traditional' Disney style".

Following the underwhelming box office performances of Pocahontas and The Hunchback of Notre Dame, studio executives felt that the project was growing too ambitious and serious for audiences following test screenings, and needed more comedy. In early 1997, producer Randy Fullmer contacted and offered Mark Dindal, who had just wrapped up work on Warner Bros.' Cats Don't Dance, to be co-director on Kingdom of the Sun. Meanwhile, Allers personally called Sting, in the wake of Elton John's success with The Lion King soundtrack, to compose several songs for the film. He agreed, but on the condition that his filmmaker wife Trudie Styler could "document the process of the production". This film, which was eventually entitled The Sweatbox, was made by Xingu Films (their own production company). Along with collaborator David Hartley, Sting composed eight songs inextricably linked with the original plot and characters.

In the summer of 1997, it was announced that Allers and Dindal would serve as the film's directors and Randy Fullmer as producer. Spade and Eartha Kitt had been confirmed to voice the emperor Manco and the villainess, while Carla Gugino was in talks for the role of Nina. Harvey Fierstein was also cast as Huaca, a 10,000 year-old rock who kept a sharp eye on the emperors who ruled before Manco.

In the summer of 1998, it became apparent that Kingdom of the Sun was not far along enough in production to be released in the summer of 2000 as planned. At this time, one of the Disney executives reportedly walked into Fullmer's office and, placing his thumb and forefinger a quarter-inch apart, angrily stated "your film is this close to being shut down." Fullmer approached Allers, and informed him of the need to finish the film on time for its summer 2000 release as crucial promotional deals with McDonald's, Coca-Cola and other companies were already established and depended upon meeting that release date. From screenings, Allers' vision of the film was recognized as having far too many elements. Schumacher and Peter Schneider spoke to Allers and Dindal to try to work out a pared down film, but the two had different ideas for which direction to take the film. Schumacher and Schneider broke the staff into two small teams under Allers and Dindal, and effectively had them run a "bake-off" to decide which version to go. While Allers altered some of the details of the original pitch, Dindal proposed a complete tonal shift into a comedy that Schumacher and Schneider responded favorably to. Allers gracefully allowed Dindal's version of the film to go forward, and opted to step down from co-director. With this change in direction, on September 23, 1998, the project became dormant with production costs amounting towards $25–30 million and twenty-five percent of the film animated.

Production overhaul and changes
Upset that Allers left the project, Eisner gave Fullmer two weeks to salvage the project or production would be completely shut down. Fullmer and Dindal halted production for six months to retool the project, renaming it from Kingdom of the Sun to Kingdom in the Sun, thus making it the first Disney animated feature to have an extensive overhaul since Pinocchio. Meanwhile, following Eric Goldberg's pitch for the Rhapsody in Blue segment for Fantasia 2000, the animators were reassigned to work on the segment.

Story work on the revised film started when they knew what to retain from the original version, namely David Spade as Manco and Eartha Kitt as Yzma, with the remaining elements to be written around those characters. Chris Williams, who was a storyboard artist during Kingdom of the Sun, came up with the idea of making Pacha an older character as opposed to the teenager that he was in the original version, as to be the opposite of Manco. Following up on the new idea, former late-night comedy writer David Reynolds stated, "I pitched a simple comedy that's basically a buddy road picture with two guys being chased in the style of a Chuck Jones 'toon, but faster paced. Disney said, 'Give it a shot." One of the new additions to the revised story was the scene-stealing character of Yzma's sidekick Kronk. Kronk was inspired by actor Rick Rossovich, according to Williams, and as they wrote for him, Reynolds immediately thought of casting Patrick Warburton for the role based on his character Puddy from Seinfeld.  Meanwhile, the name Manco was changed to Kuzco following Fullmer's discovery of the Japanese slang term manko, which translates to cunt. Due in part of the production shutdown, Sting began to develop schedule conflicts with his songwriting duties interfering with his work on his next album he was planning to record in Italy. "I write the music, and then they're supposed to animate it, but there are constantly changes being made. It's constantly in turnaround," the singer-songwriter admitted, but "I'm enjoying it." Because of the shutdown, the computer-animated film Dinosaur assumed the summer 2000 release date originally scheduled for Kingdom.

Andreas Deja declined to return to the film after observing his more serious version of Yzma was incompatible with the new comedic tone of the film, and moved to Orlando, Florida to work on Lilo & Stitch. Animator Dale Baer would replace Deja as the supervising animator for Yzma. Fullmer would inform Sting by telephone that his songs, related to specific scenes and characters that were now gone, had to be dropped. Bitter about the removal of his songs, the pop musician commented that "At first, I was angry and perturbed. Then I wanted some vengeance." Disney eventually agreed to allow three of the six deleted songs as bonus tracks on the soundtrack album, such as Yzma's villain song "Snuff Out the Light", the love song "One Day She'll Love Me" and the dance number "Walk the Llama, Llama". The plot elements, such as the romance between the llama herder Pacha and Manco's betrothed Nina, the sun-capturing villain scheme, similarities to The Prince and the Pauper story and Inca mythology were dropped. The character of Hucua was also dropped, though he would make a cameo appearance as the candle holder during the dinner scene in the finished film. Kuzco—who was a supporting character in the original story—eventually became the protagonist.

In the summer of 1999, cast members Owen Wilson, Harvey Fierstein and Trudie Styler were dropped from the film. Kitt and Spade remained in the cast, Dindal commented, "[a]nd then John Goodman and Patrick Warburton came aboard." After Sting's songs for Kingdom of the Sun were dropped from the new storyline, Sting remained on the project, though he was told by the studio that "[a]ll we want is a beginning and an end song." The song, "Perfect World", was approached "to open the movie with a big, fun number that established the power of Kuzco and showed how he controlled the world", according to then-Feature Animation president Thomas Schumacher. The filmmakers had asked Sting to perform the song for the film, though Sting declined by telling them that he was too old to sing it and that they should find someone younger and hipper. They instead went with Tom Jones, who is eleven years older than Sting.

In February 2000, the new film was announced as The Emperor's New Groove with its new story centering on a spoiled Inca Emperor—voiced by Spade—who through various twists and falls ends up learning the true meaning of friendship and happiness from a poor peasant voiced by Goodman. The release date was shifted to December 2000. Despite the phrasing of the title, the film was not related to Hans Christian Andersen's classic Danish fairy tale "The Emperor's New Clothes" (although both stories involve an emperor being tricked). However, according to Mark V. Moorhead of the Houston Press, the film's plot does bear some resemblance to that of The Golden Ass by Lucius Apuleius, wherein a man is turned into a donkey.

Eisner worried that the new story was too close in tone to Hercules, which had performed decently yet below expectations at the American box office. Dindal and Fullmer assured him that The Emperor's New Groove, as the film was now called, would have a much smaller cast, making it easier to attract audiences. Towards end of production, the film's ending originally had Kuzco building his Kuzcotopia amusement park on another hill by destroying a rainforest near Pacha's home and inviting the former and his family to visit. Horrified at the ending, Sting commented that "I wrote them a letter and said, 'You do this, I'm resigning because this is exactly the opposite of what I stand for. I've spent 20 years trying to defend the rights of indigenous people and you're just marching over them to build a theme park. I will not be party to this.'" As a result, the ending was rewritten in which Kuzco instead constructs a shack similar to Pacha's and spends his vacation among the villagers.<ref>[[#DVD2|Supplemental Features – Deleted and Unused Scenes, Including 'Destruction of Pacha's Village,' 'Pacha's Family' and 'Original Kuscotopia Ending']]</ref>

Design and animation
During production on Kingdom of the Sun, Deja was the initial supervising animator of Yzma and incorporated supermodeling poses published in magazines to capture Yzma's sultry, seductive persona. Nik Ranieri was originally slated as the supervising animator for Yzma's rocky sidekick, Hucua. During the research trip to Peru in 1996, Ranieri acknowledged that he "was researching for a character that looked like a rock so I was stuck drawing rocks for the whole trip. Then when we got back they piled it into this story about ancient Incas." Mark Pudleiner was to be the supervising animator of Kuzco's proposed maiden, Nina. In early 1997, David Pruiksma came on board to animate the llama, Snowball. According to Pruiksma, Snowball was "a silly, vain and egotistical character, rather the dumb blond of the llama set. I really enjoyed developing the character and doing some early test animation on her as well. Before I left the film (and it was ultimately shelved), I created model sheets for not only Snowball, but for the rest of the herd of seven other llamas and for Kuzco as a Llama." When the film was placed on production shutdown, Pruiksma transferred to work on Atlantis: The Lost Empire being developed concurrently and ultimately the llama characters were dropped from the storyline.

Following the production overhaul and the studio's attempts for more cost-efficient animated features, Dindal urged for "a simpler approach that emphasized the characters rather than overwhelming special effects or cinematic techniques". Because of the subsequent departure of Deja, animator Dale L. Baer inherited the character of Yzma. Using Kitt's gestures during recording sessions, Baer commented that "She has a natural voice for animation and really got into the role. She would gesture wildly and it was fun just to watch her. She would come into each session almost serious and very professional and suddenly she would go wild and break up laughing." Ranieri was later asked to serve as the supervising animator of Kuzco (as a human and a llama), though he would admit being reluctant at first until he discovered that Kuzco "had a side to him, there was a lot of comedy potential and as a character he went through an arc". Pudleiner was also reassigned to work as an animator of the human version of Kuzco. In addition to drawing inspiration from Spade during recording sessions, the Kuzco animation team studied llamas at the zoo, visited a llama farm, watched nature documentaries, and even observed the animals up close when they came for a visit to the studio. For the rewritten version of Pacha, animator Bruce W. Smith observed that "Pacha is probably the most human of all the characters," and further added that he "has more human mannerisms and realistic traits, which serve as a contrast to the cartoony llama he hangs out with. He is the earthy guy who brings everything back into focus. Being a big fellow about six-foot-five and weighing about 250 pounds we had to work hard to give him a sense of weight and believability in his movement."

Actual animation began in 1999, involving 400 artists and 300 technicians and production personnel. Outside of the Walt Disney Feature Animation studio building in Burbank, California, animators located at Walt Disney Feature Animation Florida and Walt Disney Feature Animation Paris assisted in the production of The Emperor's New Groove. During the last eighteen months of production, a 120-crew of clean-up artists would take the character animators' drawings and place a new piece of paper over the existing drawing to draw a cleaner, more refined image. "We're basically the final designers", said clean-up supervisor Vera Pacheco, whose crew worked on more than 200,000 drawings for the film.

Music

Release
After the release date had shifted to December 2000, similarities were noted between the film and DreamWorks Animation's The Road to El Dorado. Jeffrey Katzenberg had been at Disney while production began on Kingdom of the Sun, but then left and started DreamWorks in 1994, and there is some speculation that The Road to El Dorado was based on what Katzenberg had seen at Disney. Marc Lument, a visual development artist on El Dorado, claimed "It really was a race, and Katzenberg wanted ours out before theirs." Lument also added that, "We didn't know exactly what they were doing, but we had the impression it was going to be very similar. Whoever came out second would face the impression that they copied the other." Fullmer and Dindal denied the similarities with the latter commenting "This version [The Emperor's New Groove] was well in the works when that movie came out," and further added, "Early on, when our movie got to be very comic, all of us felt that you can't be making this farce about a specific group of people unless we are going to poke fun at ourselves. This didn't seem to be a proper choice about Incas or any group of people. It was more of a fable."

The marketing campaign for The Emperor's New Groove was relatively restrained as Disney opted to heavily promote the release of 102 Dalmatians, which was released during Thanksgiving. Nevertheless, the film was accompanied with six launcher toys of Kuzco, Kuzco as a llama, Pacha, Yzma, Yzma as a cat and Kronk, accompanied with Happy Meals at McDonald's in North America. McDonald's also released toys for the film in Europe, Asia, and Australia.

The film premiered at the El Capitan Theatre on December 10, 2000, with Sting in attendance.

Home media
The film was released on VHS and DVD on May 1, 2001, as well as a "2-Disc Collector's Edition" that included bonus features such as Sting's music video of "My Funny Friend and Me", a Rascal Flatts music video of "Walk the Llama, Llama" from the soundtrack, audio commentary with the filmmakers, a multi-skill-level set-top game with the voice cast, and deleted scenes among other features. This THX certified DVD release also contained a DTS 5.1 audio track and DVD-ROM. Unlike its theatrical box office performance, the film performed better on home video, becoming the top-selling home video release of 2001. In September 2001, it was reported that six million VHS units were sold amounting towards $89 million in revenue. On DVD, it was also reported it had sold twice as many sales. The overall revenue averaged toward $125 million according to Adams Media Research. It was re-released on VHS on February 25, 2003.

Disney re-released a single-disc special edition called "The New Groove Edition" on October 18, 2005. Disney then digitally remastered and released The Emperor's New Groove on Blu-ray on June 11, 2013, bundled in a two-movie collection combo pack with its sequel Kronk's New Groove. On its first weekend, it sold 14,000 Blu-ray units grossing $282,000.

Reception
Box office
Despite making back its budget, The Emperor's New Groove was considered a box office disappointment, grossing considerably less than any of Disney's animated films from the 1990s. The film grossed roughly $10 million on its opening weekend, opening in fourth place behind What Women Want, Dude, Where's My Car?, and How the Grinch Stole Christmas. It also competed with Disney's own 102 Dalmatians, which had released just three weeks prior. The film ultimately made $89.3 million in  the United States and an additional $80 million worldwide for a total of $169.6 million— the lowest box office earnings for an animated Disney feature since the 1980s. In January 2021, the movie was re-released in theaters, and earned an additional $334,000.

Because of its pre-Columbian setting and Latin American flavor, Disney spent $250,000 in its marketing campaign towards the Latino market releasing dual English- and Spanish-language theatrical prints in sixteen multiplexes across heavily populated Latino areas in Los Angeles, California in contrast to releasing dubbed or subtitled theatrical prints of their previous animated features in foreign markets. By January 2001, following nineteen days into its theatrical general release, the Spanish-dubbed prints were pulled from multiplexes as Hispanic Americans opted to watch the English-language prints with its grossing averaging $571,000 in comparison to $96,000 for the former.

Critical response
The site's critical consensus reads: "The Emperor's New Groove isn't the most ambitious animated film, but its brisk pace, fresh characters, and big laughs make for a great time for the whole family." On Metacritic, the film has a score of 70 out of 100 based on 28 critics, indicating "generally favorable reviews". Audiences polled by CinemaScore gave the film an average grade of "A" on an A+ to F scale.

Writing for Variety, Robert Koehler commented the film "may not match the groovy business of many of the studio's other kidpix, but it will be remembered as the film that established a new attitude in the halls of Disney's animation unit". Roger Ebert, writing his review for Chicago Sun-Times, awarded the film 3 (out of 4) stars distinguishing the film as "a goofy slapstick cartoon, with the attention span of Donald Duck that is separate from what's known as animated features". Ebert would later add that "it doesn't have the technical polish of a film like Tarzan, but is a reminder that the classic cartoon look is a beloved style of its own." Emma Cochrane of Empire Magazine gave the film a three out of five stars, writing, "An attractive, generally enjoyable concoction, but never really hits its comedic or emotional targets full on. Fun but quickly forgettable." Lisa Schwarzbaum of Entertainment Weekly graded the film a B+, describing it as a "hip, funny, mostly nonmusical, decidedly non-epic family picture, which turns out to be less of a hero's journey than a meeting of sitcom minds".

The film was not without its detractors. Marc Savlov of The Austin Chronicle gave the film 2 stars out of 5, noting that the film "suffers from a persistent case of narrative backsliding that only serves to make older members of the audience long for the days of the dwarves, beauties, and poisoned apples of Disney-yore, and younger ones squirm in their seats". Savlov also unfavorably compared the film's animation to that of Tarzans, writing it "is also a minor letdown, with none of the ecstatic visual tour de force." Bob Strauss, in his review for the Los Angeles Daily News, acknowledged that the film is "funny, frantic and colorful enough to keep the small fry diverted for its short but strained 78 minutes", though except for "some nice voice work, a few impressive scale gags and interesting, Inca-inspired design elements, there is very little here for the rest of the family to latch onto". Strauss blamed the film's story overhaul during production as the main problem.

Accolades
In 2018, The Emperor's New Groove was named the 16th-best Disney animated film by IGN, and the 27th by Rotten Tomatoes in November 2022. In 2022, it did not appear in lists of the best Disney movies, between 35 chosen by Harper's Bazaar and 50 selected by Time Out.

The SweatboxThe Sweatbox is a documentary that chronicled the tumultuous collaboration of Sting and David Hartley with the Disney studios to compose six songs for Kingdom of the Sun (the film's working title). The documentary featured interviews from directors Roger Allers and Mark Dindal, producer Randy Fullmer, Sting (whose wife Trudie Styler created the documentary), Disney story artists, and the voice cast being dismayed by the new direction. Disney was not believed to be opposed to Styler's documentary, with Disney animation executive Thomas Schumacher, who had seen footage, commenting that "I think it's going to be great!"

The film premiered at the 2002 Toronto International Film Festival, but has gone virtually unseen by the public ever since. Disney owns the rights, but has never officially released it. In March 2012, a workprint of the documentary was leaked online and was uploaded onto YouTube by a United Kingdom cartoonist before it was ultimately pulled. As of April 2015, some scenes from the documentary could be seen from the home media release, including the behind-the-scenes and the making of "My Funny Friend and Me".

LegacyThe Emperor's New Groove was not as well received as Disney's other animated features at the time which were more focused on Broadway-style musicals like Beauty and the Beast or heroic characters with comedy situations like Hercules, and arrived just before films like Shrek and Ice Age that would launch a wave of animated comedy films. The film, as well as The Road to El Dorado, have since gained appreciation as standalone works from that period as well-written comedies in part due to the arrival of Internet culture. For The Emperor's New Groove, the film has comedic timing and slapstick comedy that has been compared to classic Looney Tunes. As a result, numerous Internet memes based on screenshots from the film have emerged via social media groups such as "Llamaposting", with content such as Pacha's "just right" gesture as an image macro representing perfection or, in the turbulent 2020, a meme featuring Kronk documenting "Apocalypse Bingo" making the rounds to every major social media outlet.

Franchise

DisneyToon Studios produced a direct-to-video sequel titled Kronk's New Groove, which was released on December 13, 2005, followed by an animated television series on Disney Channel titled The Emperor's New School. Patrick Warburton, Eartha Kitt, and Wendie Malick reprised their roles for the sequel and series while J. P. Manoux replaced David Spade for the series and Fred Tatasciore voiced Pacha in season 1. John Goodman subsequently reprises his role for the second and final season for the series.

Kuzco appears as a recurring guest in the animated television series House of Mouse and its direct-to-video film Mickey's Magical Christmas: Snowed in at the House of Mouse, with Pacha, Yzma and the Royal Recordkeeper also having minor guest appearances in the show.

Two video games were developed and released concurrent with the film. The first, for the Sony PlayStation, was developed by Argonaut Games and published by Sony Computer Entertainment of America. The second, for the Nintendo Game Boy Color, was developed by Sandbox and published by Ubisoft. Both titles were released in PAL territories the following year. The PlayStation version was re-released for the North American PlayStation Network on July 27, 2010. Additionally, Kuzco, Pacha, Yzma and Kronk appear as playable characters in the world builder video game Disney Magic Kingdoms, as well as attractions based on Mudka's Meat Hut and Yzma's Lair.

The Tokyo DisneySea rollercoaster attraction Raging Spirits'' took visual inspiration for its Inca ruins theme from the buildings in the film with a structure based on Kuzco's palace similarly crowning the ruins site.

References

DVD

External links

 
 Official website (archive)
 
 
 
 

 
2000 films
2000s English-language films
2000 animated films
2000 comedy films
2000s buddy comedy films
2000s fantasy comedy films
2000s adventure comedy films
2000s American animated films
2000s children's animated films
American buddy films
American animated fantasy films
American adventure comedy films
American children's animated fantasy films
American slapstick comedy films
Animated adventure films
Animated buddy films
American animated comedy films
Animated films about friendship
American animated feature films
Annie Award winners
Films about witchcraft
Films about potions
Films about shapeshifting
Films adapted into television shows
Films directed by Mark Dindal
Films with screenplays by Chris Williams
Films scored by John Debney
Films set in the Inca Empire
Films set in palaces
Films set in Peru
Films set in South America
Indigenous cinema in Latin America
Film and television memes
Films about narcissism
Self-reflexive films
Walt Disney Animation Studios films
Walt Disney Pictures animated films
Animated films about squirrels